Stanisławka may refer to the following places:
Stanisławka, Nakło County in Kuyavian-Pomeranian Voivodeship (north-central Poland)
Stanisławka, Toruń County in Kuyavian-Pomeranian Voivodeship (north-central Poland)
Stanisławka, Puławy County in Lublin Voivodeship (east Poland)
Stanisławka, Zamość County in Lublin Voivodeship (east Poland)
Stanisławka, Pomeranian Voivodeship (north Poland)